Dockery is an unincorporated community located in Sunflower County, Mississippi.

The historic Dockery Plantation is located in Dockery.

References

Unincorporated communities in Sunflower County, Mississippi
Unincorporated communities in Mississippi